Sir William Henry Fremantle,  (28 December 176619 October 1850) was a British courtier and politician. He served as Treasurer of the Household from 1826 to 1837.

Background
Fremantle was the son of John Fremantle, of Aston Abbots, Buckinghamshire, by his wife Frances Edwards, daughter of John Edwards, of Bristol. He was the brother of Sir Thomas Fremantle and the uncle of Thomas Fremantle, 1st Baron Cottesloe, and Sir Charles Fremantle.

Political career
Fremantle began his parliamentary career by being elected Member of Parliament for the Irish borough of Enniskillen at a by-election on 31 July 1806. He represented the seat until the dissolution of Parliament on 24 October 1806. He served under Lord Grenville as Junior Secretary to the Treasury between 1806 and 1807. He stood for Saltash in November 1806, was initially defeated but returned on petition in February 1807. He stood for Saltash once again in May 1807 alongside his brother Thomas. This time there was a double return and in February 1808 Fremantle was declared not elected. In May 1808 he was successfully returned for Tain Burghs, a seat he held until 1812, and then represented Buckingham until 1827. He was sworn of the Privy Council in 1822. In 1826 he was appointed Treasurer of the Household, which he remained until 1837. He was also Ranger of Windsor Great Park.

Personal life
Fremantle married Selina Mary Elwell, daughter of Sir John Elwell, 4th Baronet, and widow of Felton Lionel Hervey, in 1797. She died in November 1841. Fremantle died in October 1850, aged 83. Following the death of his brother, Stephen, he acted as a proxy father to his nephew, John Fremantle who went on to fight in the Peninsular War and at Waterloo.

References

External links 
 

1766 births
1850 deaths
Treasurers of the Household
Members of the Privy Council of the United Kingdom
Members of the Parliament of the United Kingdom for English constituencies
UK MPs 1802–1806
UK MPs 1806–1807
UK MPs 1807–1812
UK MPs 1812–1818
UK MPs 1818–1820
UK MPs 1820–1826
UK MPs 1826–1830
Members of the Parliament of the United Kingdom for County Fermanagh constituencies (1801–1922)
Members of the Parliament of the United Kingdom for Scottish constituencies